This is a list of events in Scottish television from 1967.

Events

16 July - Scottish Television airs the documentary The Bowler and the Bunnet, directed and presented by Sean Connery. It is the only film ever directed by Connery.
31 August - Tenth anniversary of Scottish Television.

Television series
Scotsport (1957–2008)
The White Heather Club (1958–1968)
Dr. Finlay's Casebook (1962–1971)
The Adventures of Francie and Josie (1962–1970)

Births

1 January - Sharon Small, actress
11 January - Derek Riddell, actor
2 March - Ian Oliver, author and broadcaster
11 March - John Barrowman, Scottish-American actor
17 April - Henry Ian Cusick, actor

See also
1967 in Scotland

References

 
Television in Scotland by year
1960s in Scottish television